Barnebys is a search engine for art, antiques and collectibles from more than 3,000 auction houses and galleries around the world. Barnebys offers a free-to-use database of realized prices, dating back to the beginning of the 1970s and providing over forty million sold lots. 

Barnebys launched in Scandinavia in autumn 2011. Since 2013 Barnebys has been established in the UK, United States, France, Spain, Germany and Hong Kong, listing a range of auction houses such as Sotheby's, Christie's and Phillips.

In May 2014 the Financial Times described Barnebys as one of the leading contenders in the auction world.

In 2018, Barnebys acquired ValueMyStuff, founded by Patrick van der Vorst

References

External links 
 

Online auction websites of Sweden
Online companies of Sweden